Abell 13 is a type 4 planetary nebula in the constellation of Orion. It has a reddish color and is very faint.

References

Abell 13
13
Orion (constellation)